Timofei Amvrosievich Strokach (Tymofiy Strokach; 4 March 1903 – 15 August 1963) was a prominent military figure of the Soviet NKVD and KGB.

Early life and education
Ethnic Ukrainian Strokach was born on 4 March 1903 in village of Belotserkovitsy, Primorskaya Oblast (today Astrakhanka in Primorsky Krai), in a poor peasant family of colonists from Ukraine. In 1914 he graduated a rural school and worked by helping his father. In January 1924 Strokach was called on compulsory military service.

Career
From the very start in 1924, Strokach was enlisted in the OGPU Troops as a Red Armyman of the 58th Nikolsk-Ussuriysk Border Detachment quartered in Iman (today Dalnerechensk). In 1925–1927 he was a student of the OGPU Border School #2 in Minsk. Here he joined the Communist Party of the Soviet Union in 1927. Following its graduation, Strokach returned to the Russian Far East in the 56th Blagoveshchensk Border Detachment where he served as assistant commander and commander. In 1929–1932 Strokach served in the 53rd Daursk Border Detachment.

In 1932–1933 Strokach was a student of the OGPU Border College. After its graduation, he moved to serve to border guard units in Ukraine. At first Strokach was a team commander of the 20th Slavuta Border Detachment, in 1935–1938 he was on leading roles at the 24th Mohyliv-Podilskyi Border Detachment, with a small break in 1938 when he also became a regimental commander of the 162nd regiment headquartered in Voroshylovhrad.

Just before the World War II, in 1938 Strokach became a commander of the 25th Border Detachment in Tiraspol. Following the Soviet occupation of Bessarabia and Northern Bukovina, the detachment's headquarters was relocated to Kahul in 1940. In 1941–1946 Strokach was a deputy people's commissar of Interior of UkrSSR. Soon after the Nazi Germany invasion of the Soviet Union, in 1942 he was placed in charge of the Ukrainian Staff Directorate of Partizan movement. Same year Strokach became a member of underground Central Committee of the Communist Party of Ukraine. After liberation of Ukraine, in 1944 he was placed in charge of the Directorate in combating banditry.

In 1946–1956 Strokach was a People's Commissar (Minister) of Interior (NKVD) of the Ukrainian SSR with a small break in 1953 when he headed the regional Interior service in Lviv Oblast, while his position was held by Pavlo Meshyk. In 1956–1957 Strokach was a Deputy Minister of Interior of the Soviet Union. During that period he was a commander of the Soviet Border Troops and Interior Troops.

Due to his health conditions, in 1957 Strokach retired and continued to live in Kiev. He died there on August 15, 1963, aged 60, and was buried at Baikove Cemetery.

Awards
 Order of Lenin (1943, 1948, 1949)
 Order of the Red Banner (1945, 1954)
 Order of Suvorov (1st degree, 1945)
 Order of the Great Patriotic War (1st degree, 1945)
 Order of the Red Star (1952)
 Honorary badge "Merited NKVD agent" (1942)

References

External links
 
 Timofei Strokach at Sword and Shield

1903 births
1963 deaths
People from Khankaysky District
People from Primorskaya Oblast
Generals of the Internal Service (Ukraine)
Soviet interior ministers of Ukraine
Second convocation members of the Verkhovna Rada of the Ukrainian Soviet Socialist Republic
Soviet lieutenant generals
Central Committee of the Communist Party of Ukraine (Soviet Union) members
KGB officers
NKVD officers
Burials at Baikove Cemetery
Soviet border guards
Recipients of the Order of Lenin
Recipients of the Order of the Red Banner
Recipients of the Order of the Red Star
Recipients of the Order of Suvorov, 1st class